The class C G-protein-coupled receptors are a class of G-protein coupled receptors that include the metabotropic glutamate receptors and several additional receptors.

Structurally they are composed of four elements; an N-terminal signal sequence; a large hydrophilic extracellular agonist-binding region containing several conserved cysteine residues which could be involved in disulphide bonds; a shorter region containing seven transmembrane domains; and a C-terminal cytoplasmic domain of variable length. This protein family includes metabotropic glutamate receptors, the extracellular calcium-sensing receptors, the gamma-amino-butyric acid (GABA) type B receptors, and the vomeronasal type-2 receptors.

Subfamilies

Calcium-sensing receptor-related
 extracellular calcium-sensing receptor-related 
 Calcium-sensing receptor
 GPRC6A

GABAB receptors
 GABAB receptor (gamma-aminobutyric acid) 
 GABAB receptor 1
 GABAB receptor 2

Metabotropic glutamate receptors
 Metabotropic glutamate receptors (mGluR) 
 mGluR1
 mGluR2
 mGluR3
 mGluR4
 mGluR5
 mGluR6
 mGluR7
 mGluR8

RAIG
 Retinoic acid-inducible orphan G protein-coupled receptors (RAIG)
 RAIG1
 RAIG2
 RAIG3
 RAIG4

Taste receptors
 Taste receptor
 Taste receptor, type 1, member 1
 Taste receptor, type 1, member 2
 Taste receptor, type 1, member 3

Orphan
 Class C Orphan receptors
 GPR158
 GPR179
 GPR156

Other
 Bride of sevenless protein 
 Vomeronasal receptor, type 2

References

G protein-coupled receptors